Sandra Kalniete (born 22 December 1952) is a Latvian politician, author, diplomat and independence movement leader. She served as Foreign Minister of Latvia 2002–2004 and as European Commissioner for Agriculture, Rural Development and Fisheries in 2004. Since 2009, she has served as Member of the European Parliament (MEP) for the European People's Party.

She is currently a member of the Committee on Foreign Affairs (AFET) and a substitute member of the Committee on Agriculture and Rural Development (AGRI).
Additionally she is a member on the Delegation for relations with the countries of Southeast Asia and the Association of Southeast Asian Nations (ASEAN) and a substitute member on the Delegation to the EU-Ukraine Parliamentary Cooperation Committee and on the Delegation to the Euronest Parliamentary Assembly.

After her reelection in 2014 she became Vice-Chair of the Group of the European People's Party in the European Parliament.
 
Kalniete is also the chairperson of the Reconciliation of European Histories Group, an all-party group in the European Parliament involved in promoting the Prague Process. The group includes 40 MEPs from across the political spectrum including the European People's Party, the Alliance of Liberals and Democrats, the Greens, and the Progressive Alliance of Socialists and Democrats.

She has previously served as Ambassador to the United Nations (1993–97), France (1997–2000) and UNESCO (2000–02). Beside her native Latvian language she is also fluent in English, French and Russian.

Background

Kalniete was born in Togur, Kolpashevsky District, Tomsk Oblast, Siberia, Russia, where her family had been deported from Latvia by the Soviet secret police during the occupation of her country by the Soviet Union, for use as slave labour. Her mother Ligita Kalniete (née Dreifelde, 1926-2006) was first deported together with her mother and father in 1941, after which Ligita returned in 1948, just to be deported again in 1949. Her father Aivars Kalnietis (born 1931) was deported together with his mother in 1949 as well. She only saw her native country when she was five years old, when the family was allowed to return in 1957.

She studied art at the Latvian Academy of Art from 1977 to 1981 and worked as an art historian, publishing a book, Latvian Textile Art, in 1989. She joined politics in 1988, during Latvia's independence movement, and was a deputy chairwoman and one of the founders of Latvian Popular Front, the main pro-independence political organization. Ms. Kalniete has graduated from the Department of Art History and Art Theory at the Art Academy of Latvia (1981), the Institute for International Studies at the University of Leeds (1992), The Graduate Institute of International Studies at the University of Geneva (1995), and has a Master of Arts from the Art Academy of Latvia (1996).

After Latvia declared independence, Kalniete worked in Latvia's Ministry of Foreign Affairs and served as Latvia's ambassador to the UN (from 1993 to 1997), France (from 1997 to 2000) and UNESCO (from 2000 to 2002).

Political career
Kalniete became Foreign Minister of Latvia in November 2002 and served in this position until in 2004 when she was appointed the first Latvian Commissioner of the European Union in charge of Agriculture and Fisheries.

A large part of the Latvian society was shocked after she was not re-nominated as Latvia's EU Commissioner. Afterwards, Kalniete stepped aside from politics and refused the low-rank diplomatic positions she was offered.

At the beginning of 2006, Kalniete joined the New Era Party. In October 2006, she was elected to the Latvian parliament. She was the 2007 candidate of the New Era Party for the post of Latvian president, before withdrawing in favor of Aivars Endziņš on 24 May 2007.

Between 2006 and 2007, Kalniete served as member of the Amato Group, a group of high-level European politicians unofficially working on rewriting the Treaty establishing a Constitution for Europe into what became known as the Treaty of Lisbon following its rejection by French and Dutch voters.

In 2008, Kalniete announced she was leaving the New Era Party. She joined the newly founded Civic Union and became the party's leader. 
In the 2009 European Parliament election she was elected as a Member of the European Parliament and reelected in the 2014 European Parliament election in Latvia. She put herself forward as a potential candidate to succeed Andris Bērziņš as President of Latvia after his decision to step down in 2015.

Human rights activism
Sandra Kalniete is involved in many human rights causes pertaining to totalitarian crimes. She is the chair of the Reconciliation of European Histories Group, an all-party group in the European Parliament aimed at coming to terms with the totalitarian past in many countries of Europe.

In 2004, she argued that "behind the Iron Curtain the Soviet regime continued to commit genocide against the peoples of Eastern Europe and, indeed, against its own people [...] the two totalitarian regimes—Nazism and Communism—were equally criminal." She elaborated on this in 2006 when she came up with death counts for the two regimes, pointing out that the Soviet Union killed around 94.5 million people.

Publications
She is an author of four books:
 Latviešu tekstilmāksla (Latvian Textile Art), 1989.
 Es lauzu, tu lauzi, mēs lauzām. Viņi lūza (I Broke, You Broke, We Broke. They Fell Apart), a book about Latvia's independence movement, published in 2000.
 Ar balles kurpēm Sibīrijas sniegos (With Dancing Shoes in Siberian Snows), a book about the deportation of her family to Siberia during the Joseph Stalin era and her family's efforts to return to their home country, first published in 2001.
 "Prjaņiks. Debesmannā. Tiramisū." (Gingerbread. Sweet-porridge. Tiramisu), Rīga, Zelta grauds, 2012.

With Dancing Shoes in Siberian Snows was published in French as En escarpins dans les neiges de Sibérie and was nominated for the documentary book of the month by the readers of Elle magazine. Since its publishing it has been translated into more than ten languages.

Translations
The book Ar balles kurpēm Sibīrijas sniegos, Riga, Latvia: Atēna, 2001 has been translated into several languages:

 Albanian: "Këpucë balerine mbi dëborën siberiane". Transl.: Durim Taçe. Skopje, Macedonia: Shkupi (2010). 
 French: En escarpins dans les neiges de Sibérie. Transl.: Velta Skujina. Paris, France: Editions des Syrtes, 2003. 
 German: Mit Ballschuhen im sibirischen Schnee. Transl.: Matthias Knoll. München, Germany: Herbig Verlag, 2005. 
 Italian: Scarpette da ballo nelle nevi di Siberia. Transl.: G. Weiss. Milano, Italy: Libri Scheiwiller, 2005. 
 Japanese: Dansu shûzu de yuki no Shiberia e. Transl.: Ayumi Kurosawa. Tôkyô: Shinhyôron, 2014. 
 Czech: V plesových střevíčkách sibiřským sněhem. Transl.: Michal Škrabal. Praha, Czech Republic: Lubor Kasal, 2005. 
 Swedish: Med högklackade skor i Sibiriens snö. Transl.: Juris Kronbergs. Stockholm, Sweden: Atlantis, 2005. 
 English: With Dance Shoes in Siberian Snows. Transl.: Margita Gailītis. Riga, Latvia: The Latvian Occupation Museum Association, 2006. 
 Russian: В бальных туфельках по сибирским снегам. Riga, Latvia: Atēna, 2006. 
 Finnish: Tanssikengissä Siperiaan. Transl.: Hilkka Koskela. Helsinki, Finland: Werner Söderström Osakeyhtiö, 2007. 
 Dutch: Op dansschoenen in de Siberische sneeuw. Transl.: Marijke Koekoek. Amsterdam: Uitgeverij van Gennep, 2006. 
 Arabic: Cairo, Egypt: Sphinx Agency for Arts and Literature, 2009.
 Spanish: Con zapatos de fiesta en las nieves de Siberia. Transl.: Jānis Kleinbergs; text editor: María Maestro; iluustrator: Agnese Čemme, Lasītava, 2019

Career experience and political activities
	June 2014 – Member of the European Parliament (Committee on Foreign Affairs, Agricultural un Rural Development committee)
	June 2009 – Member of the European Parliament (Internal Market and Consumer Protection committee, Agricultural un Rural Development committee, Women's Rights and Gender Equality committee)
	April 2008 – Leader of the "Civic Union" party
	January 2008 – Left party "New Era"
	October 2006 – Member of Parliament of Republic of Latvia (Foreign Affairs commission and European Affairs commission)
	January 2006 – Member of right conservative party "New Era"
	March 2005 – Ambassador, Special Adviser to EU Commissioner for Energy
	March 2005 – Member of the Board of Trustees of the independent think tank Friends of Europe, Member of Editorial Board of Europe's World
	December 2004 – Member of the Administrative Board of Robert Schuman Fondation (France)
	1 May – 20 November 2004 – the European Commissioner
	7 November 2002 – 9 March 2004  – Minister of Foreign Affairs
	2000 – 2002 Ambassador Extraordinary and Plenipotentiary and Permanent Representative of the Republic of Latvia to UNESCO
	1997 – 2002 Ambassador Extraordinary and Plenipotentiary of the Republic of Latvia to France
	1993 – 1997 Ambassador Extraordinary and Plenipotentiary of the Republic of Latvia to the United Nations in Geneva
	1990 – 1993 Ministry of Foreign Affairs: Chief of Protocol, Deputy Foreign Minister
	1988 – 1990 Latvian Popular Front (LPF): General Secretary of the LPF Coordinating Council, Deputy Chairman
	1987 – 1988 Latvian Artists' Union: General Secretary

Awards
 1995 – Commander of the Order of the Three Stars (Latvia)
2000 – Cabinet of Ministers Award (Latvia)
2001 – Commander of the Legion of Honor (France)
2002 – Commander of the Ordre des Palmes académiques (France)
2004 – Commander's Grand Cross of the Order of the Lithuanian Grand Duke Gediminas (Lithuania)
2005 – Commander of the Great Cross of the Cross of Recognition (Latvia)
	2009 – Order "Mérite Européen" in Gold (Fondation du Mérite Européen, Luxembourg): for promoting a stronger and more united Europe
	2009 – Medal of the Baltic Assembly: for organizing and coordinating the Baltic Way manifestation, for developing and strengthening unity among the Baltic Nations, and for the support and work lent to the people of the Baltic Nations
2012 – Order of the Cross of Terra Mariana, 2nd degree (Estonia)
2018 – Truman-Reagan Medal of Freedom
2020 – Order of Princess Olga, 1st Class (Ukraine)

Board-member/affiliations
 La Fondation pour l’innovation politique
 Rural Investment Support for Europe (RISE) Foundation
 Friends of Europe
 Fondation Robert-Schuman
Koknese Fund (Kokneses Fonds)
 Notre Europe
European Movement – Latvia
 Baltic - Black Sea Alliance (Baltijas-Melnās jūras alianse)
 Board of the Friends of EUROCLIO Foundation
 Advisory board member of the European Network Remembrance and Solidarity

References

External links
 Official website
 European Parliament, MEP profile: Sandra Kalniete
 Sandra Kalniete's Twitter account
 VoteWatch.eu on Sandra Kalniete
 European People's Party page on Sandra Kalniete
 European Voice topics page on Sandra Kalniete
 KALNIETE, Sandra International Who's Who.

|-

|-

|-

|-

1952 births
Living people
People from Kolpashevsky District
New Era Party politicians
Civic Union (Latvia) politicians
New Unity politicians
Ministers of Foreign Affairs of Latvia
Deputies of the 9th Saeima
Graduate Institute of International and Development Studies alumni
Ambassadors of Latvia to France
Latvian expatriates in Switzerland
Civic Union (Latvia) MEPs
Latvian European Commissioners
MEPs for Latvia 2009–2014
MEPs for Latvia 2014–2019
MEPs for Latvia 2019–2024
Permanent Delegates of Latvia to UNESCO
Permanent Representatives of Latvia to the United Nations
Female foreign ministers
Women MEPs for Latvia
Women European Commissioners
Women government ministers of Latvia
21st-century Latvian women politicians
Latvian women diplomats
Women ambassadors
Commandeurs of the Ordre des Palmes Académiques
Recipients of the Order of the Cross of Terra Mariana, 2nd Class
Women deputies of the Saeima